Kelechi "KC" Ohaebosim (born December 27, 1978) is an American politician. He has served as a Democratic member for the 89th district in the Kansas House of Representatives since 2017.

References

External links
Vote Smart

1978 births
Living people
Democratic Party members of the Kansas House of Representatives
21st-century American politicians
American people of Igbo descent
African-American state legislators in Kansas
Wichita State University alumni
Newman University, Wichita alumni
21st-century African-American politicians
20th-century African-American people